Hiliuți is a commune in Făleşti District, Moldova. It is composed of two villages, Hiliuți and Răuțelul Nou.

References

Communes of Fălești District